Liolaemus silvai is a species of lizard in the family Liolaemidae. The species is endemic to Chile, with occurrence noted in the Chilean matorral.

Etymology
The specific name, silvai, is in honor of Chilean zoologist Francisco Silva G., who is a professor at the Universidad de Concepción.

Habitat

Appearance 
L. silvai have been observed with two main colorings, orange and yellow. Specifically, individuals of the species typically have orange or yellow ventral coloration and black dorsal coloration with no correlation to sex.

Reproduction
L. silvai is oviparous.

References

Further reading
Ortiz JC (1989). "Description de Liolaemus silvai sp nov. (Sauria: Iguanidae) du 'norte Chico' du Chili ". Bulletin du Muséum National d'Histoire Naturelle, Paris, Section A, Zoologie, Biologie et Écologie Animales 11 (1): 247–252. (Liolaemus silvai, new species). (in French).
Troncoso-Palacios J, Schulte JA II, Marambio-Alfaro Y, Hiriart D (2015). "Phenotypic Variation, Phylogenetic Position and New Distributional Records for the Poorly Known Liolaemus silvai Ortiz, 1989 (Iguania: Iguanidae: Liolaemini)". South American Journal of Herpetology 10 (2): 71–81.

External links
Hogan, C. Michael, & World Wildlife Fund (2013). Chilean matorral. ed. M.McGinley. Encyclopedia of Earth. National Council for Science and the Environment. Washington DC
"Liolaemus silvai ". Encyclopedia of Life 2013. Downloaded on 03 Dec 2013. 

silvai
Lizards of South America
Endemic fauna of Chile
Reptiles of Chile
Chilean Matorral
Reptiles described in 1989